The 2000–01 Washington Huskies men's basketball team represented the University of Washington for the 2000–01 NCAA Division I men's basketball season. Led by eighth-year head coach Bob Bender, the Huskies were members of the Pacific-10 Conference and played their home games on campus at newly-renovated Hec Edmundson Pavilion in 

There was no conference tournament this season; last played in 1990, it resumed in 2002.

In the season finale, the Huskies upset #13 UCLA 96–94; senior guard Michael Johnson hit a three-pointer with a second remaining to break an eight-game losing streak.

References

External links
Sports Reference – Washington Huskies: 2000–01 basketball season

Washington Huskies men's basketball seasons
Washington Huskies
Washington
Washington